Mohamad Mahfoud (born July 11, 1957) is a Syrian sport shooter. He placed 53rd in the men's 50 metre rifle prone event at the 2000 Summer Olympics.

References

1957 births
Living people
ISSF rifle shooters
Syrian male sport shooters
Olympic shooters of Syria
Shooters at the 2000 Summer Olympics